Çaykur Rizespor Kulübü is a Turkish professional football club based in Rize. The club play in the TFF First League. The club was founded on May 19, 1953, with green-yellow as club colours, but later changed to blue-green. Since 1990, the team has been sponsored by the Turkish tea company Çaykur, hence the name and the image of a tea leaf on the club's logo. The club plays its home games in Yeni Rize Şehir Stadium.

History
A committee of five people—Yakup Temizel, Atıf Taviloğlu, İsmet Bilsel, Yaşar Tümbekçioğlu and Muharrem Kürkçü—founded the club on 19 May 1953 at the 34th anniversary year of the start of Independence War. The intention was to enhance the physical and cultural talents of the youth as well as to contribute to the developments of Rize. Domestic cultivation of lemon citruses and oranges labeled the club colour to be yellow and being Rize's symbol, tea gardens, represented the colour green. One of the founding members, Yaşar Dömlekçioğlu was chosen the first president of the club. During the amateur league years through 1953 to 1968, local-born players such as Ahmet Durmuş, Kenan Tiryaki, Mustafa Erol, İrfan Akaslan, Mahmut Salih Yavuz, Salih Kazancı, Ahmet Kemal Yavuz, Hamil Kazancı, Mustafa Veziroğlu, Yılmaz Özkan, Yılmaz Balta, Ahmet Fenci, Ekif Fence, Oktay Arayıcı, Abdullah Kıtır, Mustafa Kazdal, Abdullah Şeker and Ömer Çakır played for Rizespor.

With the regulation changes in 1968, the club formed a professional club structure by the association of two clubs, "Rize Güneşspor" and "Fenergençlik". The club started from the third division with the colours blue and green. At the end of a competitive season, as a result of a fight inside the game the club got punished with a forfeit as well as a deduction of 2 points which bereaved Rizespor from promotion that season. The punishment was the first time in the Turkish football history. In the coming period, the club did not get relegated and in 1978–1979, Rizespor won the title and qualified to play in the Turkish Süper Lig for the first time in the club history.

Rivalries 
Çaykur Rizespor-Trabzonspor rivalry is also known as the Black Sea derby. They are considered rivals due to their geographical proximity and their shared history of competing against each other in local and regional tournaments.

Stadium
The club hosts their home games at Yeni Rize Şehir Stadium since 2009–10 season. The opening game of the stadium was held on 12 August 2009, when Çaykur Rizespor hosted Fenerbahçe for an exhibition game.

Honours
 TFF First League: 
 Winner (3): 1978–79 (Group White), 1984–85 (Group A), 2017–18 TFF First League
 Runners-up (2):  2002–2003, 2012–2013
 Play-off winners (1): 1999–2000
 TFF Third League:
 Winner (1):  1993–1994 (Group 2)
 Runners-up (2):  1973–1974 (Group Red)

League participation
Süper Lig
1979–81, 1985–89, 2000–02, 2003–08, 2013–17, 2018–22

TFF First League
1974–79, 1981–85, 1989–93, 1994–00, 2002–03, 2008–13, 2017–18, 2022–

TFF Second League
1968–74, 1993–94

European history
UEFA Intertoto Cup

Kit manufacturers and shirt sponsors

Players

Current squad

Out on loan

Coaching history

Presidential history

References

External links
Official website
Rizespor on TFF.org
Rizespor

 
1953 establishments in Turkey
Association football clubs established in 1953
Football clubs in Turkey
Sport in Rize
Süper Lig clubs